The new security concept (新安全观) is a security policy enunciated by the People's Republic of China in the late 1990s. The concept is that in the post-Cold War period, nations are able to increase their security through diplomatic and economic interaction, and that the Cold war mentality of competing and antagonistic blocs is outdated. Around 2002 and 2003, this security policy seemed to merge with the foreign policy doctrine known as China's peaceful rise.

The overarching principle of the new security concept is that no single state, even the most powerful, is capable of coping with all security challenges alone.

The new security concept has influenced a number of Chinese foreign policies in the 1990s and early 21st century, including better relations with ASEAN, the formation of the Shanghai Cooperation Organisation and the Treaty of Good-Neighborliness and Friendly Cooperation Between the People's Republic of China and the Russian Federation with Russia, as well as joint efforts with the United States to control nuclear proliferation in North Korea.

See also
 Foreign relations of the People's Republic of China

References

External links
 China's Position Paper on the New Security Concept
China Offers New Security Concept at ASEAN Meetings
China’s "New Concept of Security"  
New Security Concept of China

Foreign relations of China